Oleh Hryhoryovych Bilorus (born 14 October 1939) is a Ukrainian politician, Dr.sc.oec, professor,  member-corr. of National Academy of Sciences of Ukraine (NASU) (since May 1990, Department of Economics, International Management)

Biography

Family
Bilorus was born on 14 October 1939 in Сhervona village, Fastiv Raion, Kyiv oblast in the family of teachers. He is married, his spouse Larisa (b. 1945) is as well a language teacher. Oleg Bilorus has two children, his son Igor (b. 1968) is an economist, daughter Irina (b. 1969) is a philologist, has a PhD in law.

Education
In 1960 Oleg Bilorus graduated from the Economics and Industrial Management faculty, Kyiv Institute of National Economy (with the engineer-economist specialization). He received his PhD with the thesis "The Problems of Combining the Industrial Production Processes" (1966), and doctorate thesis "Problems of Economics, Associations and Complexes (theory and methodology)"(1980). He also held research internships:
 1964-1965 at the University of Belgrade (Yugoslavia)
 1974-1975 at Harvard University and Columbia University (United States).
He speaks English, French, Serbian, Croatian, Polish, German languages.
Oleg Bilorus is the author (or coauthor) of more than 500 scientific papers, including 27 individual and collective monographs and textbooks.

Career

 1960-1962 - engineer-economist, deputy head, head of planning and economic department of  scientific production association (NPO) named after T. Shevchenko in Kharkiv
 1962-1966 - post-graduate student at the Kyiv Institute of National Economy
 1964-1965 - research fellow at the University of Belgrade (Yugoslavia)
 1966-1979 - assistant, senior research fellow, senior lecturer, associate dean, dean, rector of the Kyiv Institute of National Economy
 1970-1979 - 1st vice-rector of the Kyiv Institute of National Economy
 1974-1975 - research fellow at Harvard University and Columbia University (USA)
 1979-1986 - director of the Department of Industry, Science and Technology at the UN Secretariat in Geneva
 1986-1989 - deputy director of the Institute of Economics of USSR Planning Committee (Kyiv)
 1989-1990 - deputy director, head of Department, Institute of Economics of the Academy of Sciences of Ukraine
 1989-1992 - CEO (and founder) of the International Management Institute in Kyiv, the Director of Institute of the World Economy and International Relations affiliated with Academy of Sciences of Ukraine (since 1990)
 1992-1994 - Ambassador of Ukraine to the United States
 1996-1997 - advisor to the Prime Minister of Ukraine Pavel Lazarenko. Member of  "Lazarenko" All-Ukrainian Association "Hromada", presidium member and deputy chairman of the party (1996–1999)
 1998-2002 - People's Deputy of Ukraine in the 3rd Verkhovna Rada from "Hromada"

Politic career

 March 1998-April 2002 - People's Deputy of the 3rd Verkhovna Rada of Ukraine, from "Hromada", No. 8 in the list
 April 2002-May 2006 - People's Deputy of the 4th Verkhovna Rada, from the Yulia Tymoshenko Bloc (BYuT), No. 4 in the list
 May 2002-February 2005 - Deputy Chairman of BYuT, since February 2005 - Chairman of the BYuT fraction
 May 2006-June 2007 - People's Deputy of the 5th Verkhovna Rada, elected from the Yulia Tymoshenko Bloc, No. 11 in the list

Bilorus was re-elected into parliament for BYuT during the 2007 Ukrainian parliamentary election.

Bilorus was placed at number 122 on the electoral list of Batkivshchina during the 2012 Ukrainian parliamentary election.
 He was not re-elected into parliament.

Awards and titles
 Honored Worker of Science and Technology of Ukraine
 Doctor of Economics
 A Diplomat of the Year (United States, 1994)
 Awardee of Schlichter prize, Academy of Sciences of Ukraine (1989), and of M.Ptukha prize, (2000)
 1972, 1976 - Excellence distinction of higher education of the USSR
 1999 - Colonel-General of Zaporizhzhya Cossacks
 1970 - Honorary Hunter of Ukraine
 1970 - Medal "For Valorous Work"
 2005 - Diploma of the Verkhovna Rada of Ukraine
 2009 - Order of Prince Yaroslav the Wise fifth class

Diplomatic rank - Ambassador Extraordinary and Plenipotentiary of Ukraine (March 1992).

See also
2007 Ukrainian parliamentary election
List of Ukrainian Parliament Members 2007

References

External links
Oleg Bilorus' profile at the official web site of Verkhovna Rada

1939 births
Living people
People from Kyiv Oblast
Third convocation members of the Verkhovna Rada
Fourth convocation members of the Verkhovna Rada
Fifth convocation members of the Verkhovna Rada
Sixth convocation members of the Verkhovna Rada
Recipients of the Order of Prince Yaroslav the Wise, 5th class
Ambassadors of Ukraine to the United States
Hromada (political party) politicians
All-Ukrainian Union "Fatherland" politicians
Members of the National Academy of Sciences of Ukraine
University of Belgrade Faculty of Economics alumni
20th-century Ukrainian economists
Laureates of the Honorary Diploma of the Verkhovna Rada of Ukraine